The Thunder Basin National Grassland is located in northeastern Wyoming in the Powder River Basin between the Big Horn Mountains and the Black Hills. The Grassland provides opportunities for recreation, including hiking, sightseeing, hunting, and fishing. There are no developed campgrounds; however, camping is allowed. Land patterns are very complex because of the intermingled federal, state, and private lands.

In descending order of land area, it is located in parts of Weston, Converse, Campbell, Niobrara, and Crook counties. It is managed together with Medicine Bow - Routt National Forest from Forest Service offices in Laramie, Wyoming; its local ranger district office is in Douglas.

Ecology 
Thunder Basin National Grassland is found along the ecotone, or transition zone, between the Great Plains to the east and the sagebrush steppe to the west, and occurs across a gradient of temperature, precipitation, and elevation. As with grasslands in the Great Plains, the Thunder Basin evolved with disturbance from drought, grazing, fire and burrowing mammals. Burrowing mammals play a functional role in the grasslands. Prairie dogs increase habitat heterogeneity and biodiversity at multiple scales across the landscape by creating burrows and areas of open grassland habitat that differ from the surrounding areas and serve as habitat for other species.

Thunder Basin grassland is home to over 100 species of birds; large herbivores such as pronghorn and mule deer; small mammals like black-tailed prairie dogs, white-tailed jackrabbits, cotton tails, kangaroo rats, thirteen lined-ground squirrels, and bats; and predators such as swift fox, badgers, coyote and red fox. Domestic livestock grazing (sheep and cattle) is practiced by ranching families throughout the grassland. The area includes both sagebrush and grassland plant communities, which interact with a range of ecological disturbances to support diverse wildlife species. Researchers surveyed birds on active black-tailed prairie dog colonies and previously burned areas, as well as on paired undisturbed sites, and found that only prairie dog colonies supported breeding habitat for the imperiled mountain plover (Charadrius montanus). On the other hand, large, contiguous areas of sagebrush cover are required to support sage-grouse conservation. Management for biodiversity in this complex ecosystem depends on managing for a shifting mosaic of different disturbances to meet the needs of multiple species.

In Thunder Basin, historical wildfires do not promote the invasion of cheatgrass (Bromus tectorum) as they do in the Great Basin, where a fire-invasion feedback loop leads to plant community conversion in sagebrush ecosystems.

References

External links

 Medicine Bow-Routt National Forests & Thunder Basin National Grassland - U.S. Forest Service

Grasslands of Wyoming
National Grasslands of the United States
Medicine Bow National Forest
Routt National Forest
Protected areas of Weston County, Wyoming
Protected areas of Converse County, Wyoming
Protected areas of Campbell County, Wyoming
Protected areas of Niobrara County, Wyoming
Protected areas of Crook County, Wyoming
Protected areas established in 1960
1960 establishments in Wyoming